Coprosma huttoniana is a flowering plant in the family Rubiaceae. The specific epithet honours Ian Hutton, the Lord Howe Island based naturalist who discovered the plant and recognised it as a new species.

Description
It is a shrub or small tree growing to 4 m in height. The elliptic-ovate to narrowly elliptic leaves are 20–60 mm long, 13–25 mm wide, with a slightly foetid odour when bruised. The small green flowers are 8 mm long.. The ellipsoidal, reddish-orange fruits are 10 mm long. The flowering season is from May to July.

Distribution and habitat
The species is endemic to Australia’s subtropical Lord Howe Island in the Tasman Sea. It is common in the island's montane forests from an elevation of about 500 m upwards.

References

huttoniana
Endemic flora of Lord Howe Island
Plants described in 1990
Gentianales of Australia